José Castillo may refer to:

 José Castillo (diver) (born 1911), Cuban Olympic diver
 José Castillo (infielder) (1981–2018), Venezuelan baseball infielder
 José Castillo (pitcher) (born 1996), Venezuelan baseball pitcher
 José Castillo (police officer) (1901–1936), murdered during the Second Spanish Republic
 José Castillo (runner) (born 1968), Peruvian long-distance runner
 José Alfredo Castillo (born 1983), Bolivian football player
 José Antonio Castillo (born 1970), Spanish football midfielder
 José Carlos Castillo (born 1992), Guatemalan football forward
 José Ignacio Castillo (born 1975), Argentine football player
 José Luis Castillo (born 1973), Mexican boxer
 José Luis Castillo (activist) (born 1968), Colombian-American activist
 José Martín Castillo (born 1977), Mexican professional boxer
 José Videla Castillo (1792–1832), Argentine military officer

See also 
 José del Castillo (1737–1793), Spanish painter
 Joey Castillo (born 1966), American musician and songwriter